Aircoasters are sneaker shoes with four detachable roller skate wheels and can be used as ordinary shoe or as a roller skating device. It is a lightweight roller skate, and suitable for various forms of activities. Unlike Heelys, Aircoasters' wheels are on the sides of the shoe, not planted in the bottom of the heel.

See also
Roller shoes

Athletic shoes
Roller skates